The Nine Lives of Fritz the Cat is a 1974 American adult animated anthology black comedy film directed by Robert Taylor as a sequel to Ralph Bakshi's Fritz the Cat (1972), adapted from the comic strip by Robert Crumb, neither of whom had any involvement in the making of the film. The only two people involved in the first film to work on the sequel were voice actor Skip Hinnant, and producer Steve Krantz. The film's music score was composed by jazz musician Tom Scott, and performed by Scott and his band The L.A. Express.

Like the first film, The Nine Lives of Fritz the Cat focuses on Fritz (voiced by Hinnant), a fraudulent womanizer and leftist, who is shown in this film to have married an unpleasant woman, with whom he shares an apartment with their infant son. Unlike the first film, The Nine Lives of Fritz the Cat adopts a non-linear narrative and is presented as an anthology of loosely connected short stories, connected as cannabis-induced fantasies which occur as Fritz's spouse berates him. The stories depict Fritz as a Nazi stormtrooper, a rich playboy, an astronaut heading to Mars, and in an alternate reality in which  New Jersey has seceded from the United States as an entirely African American state, China and Russia. Except for the wraparound segment, none of the film's storylines are based on Robert Crumb's comics, and he was not credited on this film.

The film was written by Taylor, in collaboration with Fred Halliday and Eric Monte. The voice cast also featured Bob Holt, Peter Leeds, Louisa Moritz, Robert Ridgely, Joan Gerber, Jay Lawrence, Stanley Adams, Pat Harrington Jr., Peter Hobbs, Ralph James, Eric Monte, Glynn Turman, Gloria Jones, Renny Roker, John Hancock, Chris Graham and Felton Perry.

In contrast to the first film receiving an X rating, the sequel got an R rating, being the first American animated film to do so, and cementing the Fritz films as the holders of the first animated films to receive both ratings.

Plot 
It is the 1970s; Fritz the Cat is now married, on welfare, and has a baby named Ralphie, who casually masturbates. As his wife berates him for being an irresponsible father and husband, Fritz sits on the couch, staring off into space, smoking a marijuana joint. Tired of listening to his wife nag at him, he fades off into his own little world, imagining what life would be like for him if things were different.

The first character he meets on his stoned journey is Juan, a Puerto Rican. The two talk about Juan's sister Chita. The scene fades to Juan's house where Fritz is seen sitting on the couch smoking a joint next to Chita, while Juan is at the store. Chita complains to Fritz when he blows smoke in her eyes. His reaction is to tell her to loosen up and "embrace her fellow man", then he suddenly shoves a joint into her mouth, taking her off into her own hallucinogenic fantasy. The pot makes her horny. Meanwhile, outside, a pair of crows are about to rob the place, but decide to stay outside and watch what happens inside instead. A car pulls up and out comes Chita's father, who sees Fritz and Chita having sex, and blows Fritz apart with a shotgun. This violent display turns off the two crows, who decide to come back at another time.

In his second life, Fritz meets a drunken bum claiming to be God.

In his third life, Fritz imagines that he is a soldier in World War II-era Nazi Germany. After being caught having a ménage à trois with two German girls by a commanding officer (the two girls being the officer's wife and daughter), Fritz escapes, and winds up being an orderly to Adolf Hitler. Fritz takes the form of a therapist, and analyzes Hitler, telling him that his world domination plans were just a way of trying to get attention. In the showers, Hitler "accidentally" drops his soap, and urges Fritz to pick it up, in an attempt to rape him, and ends up getting his single testicle (a reference to the song "Hitler Has Only Got One Ball") blown off. In this segment, Fritz meets his death by way of the United States Army.

The film cuts back to 1970s-era New York in Fritz's fourth life as Fritz attempts to sell a used condom to a liquor store owner, Niki, who bets he knows who Fritz used it on. The two break out laughing as they take turns describing the woman. Fritz at one point blurts out that the woman has got the clap. When Niki asks who her name is, Fritz responds by telling him "Gina". Niki says that that's his wife's name and that she doesn't have the clap. Fritz tells him "she does now," causing Niki to curse and shout at Fritz. As he walks out of the store, Fritz bumps into a pig named Lenny. Fritz tells him that he was an irresistible stud in the 1930s.

Fritz's fifth life is a psychedelic montage of old stock film and animation, vaguely illustrating Fritz's downfall in the 1930s (losing everything to excessive partying and drinking).

In his sixth life, Fritz shows up at a pawn shop run by a Jewish crow named Morris, and tries to get a welfare check cashed. Fritz tries to make a deal with Morris: If Morris will cash Fritz's welfare check, then Fritz will give Morris a toilet seat. Morris doesn't like the deal, but suddenly getting diarrhea from the pickles he has been eating, he reluctantly accepts the deal, but instead of cashing Fritz's welfare check, he gives Fritz a space helmet.

We then see Fritz in his seventh life, as NASA hires Fritz to go into space on the first mission to Mars. While waiting for the shuttle to take off, Fritz decides to have sex with one of the reporters, a black girl. However, the space shuttle takes off a little early, and once in space, it explodes.

In Fritz's eighth life, the film portrays Fritz talking to the ghost of his black crow friend Duke, who was shot to death in the previous film. The film then flash-forwards to a future where New Jersey is a separate country from the rest of the United States, and has been renamed "New Africa", home to all black crows. Fritz is just starting his job as a courier, and he is asked by President Henry Kissinger to deliver a letter to the president of New Africa. In New Africa, Fritz finds a high crime rate, corruption, and violence. Once Fritz is led to "The Black House", he hears the president of New Africa and his vice-president talking about how low his popularity is, and how an assassination attempt would boost his popularity. The president refuses to get shot, but is shot anyway, because the vice president needs his president's popularity to increase so he will not lose the upcoming election. The vice-president blames the assassination on Fritz, because he is the only "white" cat in New Africa. Because of this, America and "New Africa" are at war, and Kissinger eventually admits an unconditional surrender. In the end, Fritz is shot for the crime he did not commit.

In his final life, Fritz finds himself living in the sewers of New York, where he meets an Indian guru and the devil. However, Fritz is given a rude awakening from his drug-induced reality by his wife, who finally throws him out of the apartment. After a quick look at all of his lives, Fritz sighs and says "This is about the worst life I've ever had."

Cast 
 Main
 Skip Hinnant as Fritz
 Reva Rose as Stella
 Bob Holt as God / NASA Assistant / American Chairman / Additional Voices
 Peter Leeds as Juan / Additional Voices
 Louisa Moritz as Chita
Charles Spidar as Duke the Crow
 1970s
 Robert Ridgely as The Devil / Additional Voices
 Fred Smoot
 Dick Whittington
 Luke Walker

 Hitler
 Larry Moss
 Joan Gerber as Han's wife
 Jim Johnson 
 Jay Lawrence
 Stanley Adams
 Pat Harrington Jr.
 Carole Androsky as Han's daughter
 Peter Hobbs as American General

 Astronaut
 Lynn Roman as Reporter
 Ralph James as Golf Oil President

 New Africa
 Eric Monte
 Glynn Turman
 Ron Knight
 Gloria Jones
 Renny Roker
 Peter Hobbs
 Buddy Arett
 John Hancock
 Chris Graham
 Felton Perry
 Anthony Mason
 Sarina C. Grant

Production 
The only two people involved in the first film to work on the sequel were Skip Hinnant, who reprises his role as the eponymous protagonist, and producer Steve Krantz. Ralph Bakshi had written and directed Fritz the Cat in 1972, but did not want to direct a sequel, and had absolutely no involvement with the film. However, Bakshi sometimes incorrectly has been credited as having worked on the film, such as in Jeff Lenburg's Who's Who in Animated Cartoons, which claims that Bakshi had been a producer on the film. The concept of a sequel to Fritz the Cat was a point of contention between Bakshi and Krantz, as Bakshi wanted to end his film with Fritz's death, and Krantz wanted Fritz to live at the end, to leave room for sequels.

For the sequel, Krantz hired animator Robert Taylor to direct. Taylor had worked on The Mighty Heroes, a superhero spoof Bakshi created in the 1960s. Stylistically, Taylor attempted to recreate only some of the elements and themes of the original film. The setting of the film's period is similar to that of the first film, with the speaker addressing the audience with "jump back, baby." However, unlike the first film, The Nine Lives of Fritz the Cat was made during the era in which it was set.  Because the filmmakers only had three years of history to work with, much of the film diverges into various storytelling directions, including sections focusing on the 1930s, Nazi Germany, and an alternate future. The film's ending credits play over animation of Fritz dancing down the street in tune with Tom Scott's music.

Taylor cowrote the film's screenplay with Fred Halliday and Eric Monte. Steve Krantz would later produce Monte's screenplay Cooley High, which was developed into the television sitcom What's Happening!! The film's title has been seen as ironic, as the character's creator Robert Crumb had previously drawn a story in which the character was killed. Crumb's comics were not generally used as the basis for the screenplay, except for the wraparound segment, and Crumb was not credited on this film, unlike the first film.

The music for this film was performed by Tom Scott and the L.A. Express.

Release 
The film was entered into the 1974 Cannes Film Festival and Taylor was nominated for a Golden Palm.

The film later achieved a cult following.

Media 
A full soundtrack album was planned for official release, but the album never came out because of the film's failure. However, a 45 RPM single featuring two songs from the film, "Jump Back," and "TCB in E" was released in 1974.

Both Fritz the Cat films are available on DVD through MGM Home Entertainment in the U.S., and Arrow Films in the UK as part of a DVD box set titled The Fritz the Cat Collection.

Reception 
Time Out described the film as being "woefully inept".

Ralph Bakshi later contrasted Taylor's efforts to how his film might have turned out if prospective distributor Warner Bros. had been allowed to tone down the content of the film, and states that Robert Crumb does not acknowledge The Nine Lives of Fritz the Cat because "He would have to say, 'Well, Ralph did do a better picture than Nine Lives.' So to Robert Crumb, there is no Nine Lives. It doesn't exist." Crumb did acknowledge the sequel in the documentary The Confessions of Robert Crumb (1987).

See also 

 List of American films of 1974

References

External links 

 
 
 
 

1974 films
1970s American animated films
American adult animated films
American International Pictures films
American animated comedy films
American black comedy films
American satirical films
American films about cannabis
Films based on American comics
Films set in the 1970s
American political comedy films
American sequel films
1970s black comedy films
Fritz the Cat
Animated films based on comics
Cultural depictions of Adolf Hitler
Cultural depictions of Richard Nixon
Cultural depictions of Henry Kissinger
1974 animated films
Animated films about cats
Films produced by Steve Krantz
Films scored by Tom Scott
1974 comedy films
1974 drama films
1970s English-language films